Novak Djokovic began the 2020 tennis season on 3 January 2020, in the first round at the inaugural 2020 ATP Cup venues in Brisbane.

Djokovic ended the season with semifinal loss at the ATP Finals in London.

Yearly summary

Early hard court season

ATP Cup

At the 2020 ATP Cup, Djokovic defeated Kevin Anderson in 3 tight sets, as Team Serbia thrashed Team South Africa 3-0. Djokovic then won his singles match against Gael Monfils in straight sets. He also won in 3 sets, in doubles with Viktor Troicki, winning the tiebreak set and saving Team Serbia. Serbia defeated Team France 2-1. Djokovic easily beat Cristian Garin in straight sets as Team Serbia beat Team Chile 3-0, and in the quarterfinals, Novak beat Denis Shapovalov in 3 sets, while Team Serbia thrashed Team Canada 3-0. Even in the semifinals, Djokovic beat Daniil Medvedev in 3 sets, while Team Serbia defeated Team Russia 3-0. In the final, Djokovic saved Team Serbia against Team Spain. He beat Rafael Nadal in straight sets, and partnered Viktor Troicki to win doubles in straight sets. Thus, Team Serbia won 2-1 and with that, won the inaugural ATP Cup title.

Australian Open

Before the actual tournament, Djokovic participated in a charity event called "Rally For Relief", to extend help for Australians suffering in the Australian Bushfires. He played for Team Williams as they defeated Team Wozniacki, 4-1. In the actual tournament, Djokovic started his title defence with a four-set win over Jan-Lennard Struff in the first round. He then defeated Tatusma Ito, Yoshihito Nishioka, Diego Schwartzman, Milos Raonic and Roger Federer, all in straight sets, to reach the final of the Australian Open. Despite being down 2 sets to 1, Djokovic came back and won the next 2 sets, to defeat Dominic Thiem in the final, and win a record-extending eighth title in Melbourne. He became World No. 1 again, and stayed as World No. 1 for all weeks, except one week, until June 2022.

Dubai

Djokovic won for the fifth time in Dubai. He won in straight sets against Malek Jaziri, Philipp Kohlschreiber and Karen Khachanov. He saved 3 match points in his semifinal against Gaël Monfils and went on to win in 3 sets. He then defeated Stefanos Tsitsipas, the second seed, in straight sets, in the final. 

He extended his winning streak to 21 matches.

Season hiatus
On March 8, due to the COVID-19 pandemic, the season went on hiatus for several months. The following measures were taken:

 The ATP and WTA announced the suspension of their 2020 tournaments until August 16. On March 18, the ATP froze their player rankings. 

 On March 17, the French Tennis Federation announced the decision of postponing the French Open, to be held now from September 27 to October 11, 2020.

 On March 24, after talks between Japan's prime minister and the International Olympic Committee president, the 2020 Summer Olympics were officially postponed to 2021. On March 30, the various organising entities reached an agreement to hold the Olympics between July 23 and August 8, 2021.

 On April 1, the All England Club announced the decision of cancelling Wimbledon, opting to focus on the 2021 edition of the tournament.

 In June, Djokovic hosted a special charity tennis tournament called Adria Tour, across his home nation Serbia and it's neighbouring countries, Croatia, Montenegro and Bosnia, since those countries had little to no cases of COVID. He planned four tournaments and an exhibition match for the same. Dominic Thiem won the first leg of the Tour in Belgrade, and the final of the second leg was supposed to take place in Zadar, between Djokovic and Andrey Rublev, but it was cancelled after Tour participants Grigor Dimitrov and Borna Coric tested positive for the Coronavirus. Soon, even Djokovic tested positive, and the Tour had to be cancelled and scrapped. Djokovic landed in controversy for organizing this tour but was later cleared of all allegations against him.

American outdoor hardcourt season

Cincinnati Masters

Djokovic started with straight sets wins over Ricard Berankis, Tennys Sandgren and Jan-Lennard Struff. After a 3-set semifinal win over Roberto Bautista Agut, Djokovic won the title, defeating Milos Raonic in the final, 1–6, 6–3, 6–4. By doing so, he won his 35th Masters 1000 title, tying Rafael Nadal’s record of most ATP Masters 1000 titles. Djokovic also achieved the Career Golden Masters for a second time and became the first player to win an ATP Tour singles title upon its resumption, after it was suspended due to the COVID-19 pandemic in March 2020.

US Open

Djokovic entered the US Open as the top seed.  Djokovic beat Damir Džumhur in straight sets, Kyle Edmund in 4 sets, and Jan-Lennard Struff in straight sets to advance to the fourth round against 20th seed Pablo Carreño Busta.  The fourth round match was uneventful until the tenth game, when Carreño Busta came back down 0–40 to hold serve; Djokovic had frustratedly hit a ball into an advertising board earlier when Carreño Busta tied it at deuce. At 5-5, Djokovic was injured and had to be treated on the court. When the match resumed, Carreño Busta took the game and a 6–5 lead in the first set, at which point Djokovic pulled out a spare ball from his pocket and again hit it behind him. The ball unintentionally struck a lineswoman in the throat, who fell to her knees and started hyperventilating. Djokovic was then defaulted from the tournament for recklessness, ending his US Open run. The US Open issued a statement regarding the default.

Clay court season

Italian Open

Djokovic defeated Salvatore Caruso and compatriot Filip Krajinovic in straight sets. He defeated Dominik Koepfer in 3 sets in the quarterfinals, and he defeated Casper Ruud in the semifinals in straight sets. Djokovic won a record 36th ATP Tour Masters 1000 title and his fifth in Rome, by defeating Diego Schwartzman in the final 7–5, 6–3.

French Open

Djokovic attempted to become the first man in the Open Era to win each Grand Slam at least twice. He defeated Mikael Ymer, Berankis, Daniel Elahi Galan and Khachanov in straight sets. In the quarterfinals, Djokovic defeated Carreño Busta in 4 sets. He won a 5-set thriller against Tsitsipas in the semifinal.  He lost in the final in straight sets to Nadal, 6-0 6-2 7-5, his first loss of the season.

European indoor hard court season

Vienna Open

In his first appearance at the Erste Bank Open since his 2007 title win, Novak Djokovic passed an early test to defeat countryman Filip Krajinovic. He went 3-5 down in the first set and also conceded a set point in the tiebreaker beating him 7–6(8–6), 6-3 in straight sets. Djokovic faced four set points in his second-round clash against Borna Ćorić, but the top seed defeated the Croatian to reach the quarter-finals. 

Djokovic then suffered his heaviest defeat ever in a three-set ATP Tour match, losing 6-2 6-1 to 42nd-ranked lucky loser Lorenzo Sonego in a strangely lacklustre quarter-final performance at the Erste Bank Open. It was only Djokovic's second loss of the year, and the first outside of a Grand Slam tournament. People close to him later revealed that he was in an incredibly bad mood after celebrated Serbian-Montenegrin bishop Amfilohije Radovic passed away few hours before the match.

ATP finals

In the ATP Finals, Djokovic lost to Daniil Medvedev in straight sets but defeated Alexander Zverev and Diego Schwartzman in straight sets to qualify for the semifinals. He then lost his semifinal match to Dominic Thiem in three sets, ending his season.

All matches
This table lists all the matches of Djokovic this year, including walkovers (W/O)

Singles matches

Doubles matches

Exhibition matches

Singles

Schedule
Per Novak Djokovic, this is his current 2020 schedule (subject to change).

Singles schedule

Doubles schedule

Yearly records

Head-to-head matchups
Novak Djokovic has a  ATP match win–loss record in the 2020 season. Bold indicates player was ranked top 10 at the time of at least one meeting. The following list is ordered by number of wins:

  Diego Schwartzman 3–0
  Jan-Lennard Struff 3–0
  Ričardas Berankis 2–0
  Karen Khachanov 2–0
  Filip Krajinović 2–0
  Gaël Monfils 2–0
  Milos Raonic 2–0
  Stefanos Tsitsipas 2–0
  Kevin Anderson 1–0
  Roberto Bautista Agut 1–0
  Salvatore Caruso 1–0
  Borna Ćorić 1–0
  Damir Džumhur 1–0
  Kyle Edmund 1–0 
  Roger Federer 1–0
  Daniel Elahi Galán 1–0
  Cristian Garín 1–0
  Tatsuma Ito 1–0
  Malek Jaziri 1–0
  Dominik Koepfer  1–0
  Philipp Kohlschreiber 1–0
  Yoshihito Nishioka 1–0
  Casper Ruud 1–0
  Tennys Sandgren 1–0
  Denis Shapovalov 1–0
  Mikael Ymer 1–0
  Alexander Zverev 1–0
  Pablo Carreño Busta 1–1
  Daniil Medvedev 1–1
  Rafael Nadal 1–1
  Dominic Thiem 1–1
  Lorenzo Sonego 0–1

* Statistics correct .

Finals

Singles: 5 (4 titles, 1 runner-up)

Team competitions: (1 title)

Earnings
Bold font denotes tournament win

 Figures in United States dollars (USD) unless noted. 
source：2020 Singles Activity
source：2020 Doubles Activity

See also
 2020 ATP Tour
 2020 Rafael Nadal tennis season
 2020 Dominic Thiem tennis season

Notes

References

External links
  
 ATP tour profile

Novak Djokovic tennis seasons
Djokovic
2020 in Serbian sport